Simon "Goose" Gosling (born 9 April 1969) is a British designer and builder of special effects models and props. He is best known for his work on the Millennium Falcon cockpit for Star Wars: The Force Awakens in 2014. Also his work on commercials featuring stop-frame animation for Brisk, Apple Jacks and Chips Ahoy in America, and the Windy Miller adverts for Quaker Oats in Britain.

Gosling has created props and models for films including The Brothers Grimm (2005), The Hitchhiker's Guide to the Galaxy (2005) and Stormbreaker (2006). In 2006, he supervised the building of Hex during  the Sky One production of Hogfather, an adaptation of the Discworld novel by author Terry Pratchett.

On 22 April 2007, Hogfather won the BAFTA Television Craft Award for best special effects.

Gosling is also a musician, appearing on the soundtrack of the PlayStation videogame Croc 2.

Selected filmography
Star Wars: Episode I – The Phantom Menace (1997) Assistant prop maker
Les Visiteurs 2 (1998) Prosthetic technician
Band of Brothers (2000) Miniature model maker
Dinotopia (2002) Miniature Modeller
The Brothers Grimm (2003) Prop Modeller
The Hitch Hikers Guide To The Galaxy (2004) Prop Modeller
Stormbreaker (2005) Electronic prop Modeller
Terry Pratchett's Hogfather (2006) Prop Modeller
I Want Candy (2006) Prop Modeller
Babylon A.D. (2007) Prop Modeller
The Colour of Magic (2007) Supervising Prop Modeller
Dread (2009)  Special effects technician
Gulliver's Travels (2010) Concept model maker
Captain America: The First Avenger (2011) Prop Modeller
Prometheus (2012) Prop Modeller
Snow White & the Huntsman (2012) Prop Modeller
Fast & Furious 6 (2013) Prop Modeller
Jupiter Ascending (2014) Prop Modeller
Kingsman: The Secret Service (2014) Prop Modeller
Pan (2015) Prop Modeller
Star Wars: The Force Awakens (2015) Senior Prop Modeller

External links
http://www.simongosling.com
http://www.imdb.com/name/nm0331517/

1969 births
Living people
Miniature model-makers
Special effects people
British designers
Video game composers